Robert L. Pierce was Chairman of the Republican Party of Wisconsin.

Biography
Pierce was born Robert Layne Pierce on May 2, 1901 in Durand, Wisconsin. He died in 1968.

Career
Pierce served as Chairman from 1942 to 1948. In 1952, he was a delegate to the Republican National Convention that nominated Dwight D. Eisenhower for President of the United States. Additionally, he was a member of the Republican National Committee.

References

See also
The Political Graveyard

People from Durand, Wisconsin
Republican Party of Wisconsin chairs
1901 births
1968 deaths